The 1979–80 Cypriot Second Division was the 25th season of the Cypriot second-level football league. Nea Salamis Famagusta FC won their 2nd title.

Format
Fourteen teams participated in the 1979–80 Cypriot Second Division. All teams played against each other twice, once at their home and once away. The team with the most points at the end of the season crowned champions. The first team was promoted to 1980–81 Cypriot First Division. The last two teams were relegated to the 1980–81 Cypriot Third Division.

Changes from previous season
Teams promoted to 1979–80 Cypriot First Division
 Keravnos Strovolou FC

Teams relegated from 1978–79 Cypriot First Division
 Nea Salamis Famagusta FC
 Digenis Akritas Morphou FC

Teams promoted from 1978–79 Cypriot Third Division
 Orfeas Nicosia

Teams relegated to 1979–80 Cypriot Third Division
 Iraklis Gerolakkou
 Parthenon Zodeia

League standings

See also
 Cypriot Second Division
 1979–80 Cypriot First Division
 1979–80 Cypriot Cup

References

Cypriot Second Division seasons
Cyprus
1979–80 in Cypriot football